Line 12 may refer to several railway routes:

Asia
 Line 12 (Beijing Subway), China (under construction)
 Line 12 (Dalian Metro), China
 Line 12 (Guangzhou Metro), China (under construction)
 Line 12 (Shanghai Metro), China
 Line 12 (Shenzhen Metro), China
 Line 12 (Mumbai Metro), India
 Downtown MRT line, numbered 12, Singapore
 Putrajaya line, or Line 12, Malaysia
 Toei Ōedo Line, originally Line 12, Tokyo, Japan

Europe
 Line 12 (Barcelona Metro), a shuttle train on the Barcelona–Vallès Line, Spain
 Line 12 (Madrid Metro), Spain
 Line 12 (Moscow Metro), Russia
 Paris Métro Line 12, France
 S12 (ZVV), Zurich, Switzerland

North America
 12 (BMT rapid transit service), New York City, US (defunct)
 Mexico City Metro Line 12, Mexico

South America
 Line 12 (CPTM), São Paulo, Brazil